The following elections occurred in the year 1918. Many of these were disrupted by the 1918 Influenza Pandemic, and the First World War.

Europe
 1918 Danish Folketing election
 1918 Danish Landsting election
 1918 Dutch general election
 1918 Icelandic sovereignty referendum
 1918 Norwegian parliamentary election
 1918 Portuguese general election
 1918 Romanian National Assembly election
 1918 Ukrainian Constituent Assembly election
 1918 Estonian Constituent Assembly election

United Kingdom
 1918 Banbury by-election
 1918 Clapham by-election
 1918 Elgin Burghs by-election
 1918 Finsbury East by-election
 1918 United Kingdom general election
 1918 Irish general election
 List of MPs elected in the 1918 United Kingdom general election
 1918 Manchester North East by-election
 1918 Newcastle-upon-Tyne by-election
 January 1918 Prestwich by-election
 October 1918 Prestwich by-election
 1918 South Shields by-election
 1918 Wansbeck by-election
 1918 Wilton by-election

Americas
 1918 Argentine legislative election
 1918 Brazilian general election
 1918 Nicaraguan parliamentary election

Canada
 1918 Edmonton municipal election
 1918 Toronto municipal election

United States
1918 United States elections
United States House of Representatives elections in California, 1918
 1918 California gubernatorial election
 1918 Minnesota gubernatorial election
 1918 New York state election
 United States Senate special election in South Carolina, 1918
 United States Senate election in South Carolina, 1918
 United States House of Representatives elections in South Carolina, 1918
 1918 South Carolina gubernatorial election
 1918 United States House of Representatives elections
 1918 United States Senate elections

United States Senate
 United States Senate election in Massachusetts, 1918
 United States Senate election in South Carolina, 1918
 United States Senate special election in South Carolina, 1918
 1918 United States Senate elections

Panama
 1918 Panamanian parliamentary election
 1918 Panamanian presidential election

Oceania

Australia
 1918 South Australian state election
 1918 Swan by-election

New Zealand
 1918 Grey by-election
 1918 Palmerston by-election
 1918 Taranaki by-election
 1918 Wellington Central by-election
 1918 Wellington North by-election
 1918 Wellington South by-election

See also
 :Category:1918 elections

1918
Elections